HMS Arbutus was a  of the Royal Navy, which was active during the Second World War. She was a successful escort vessel, and took part in the destruction of two U-boats during the Battle of the Atlantic. Arbutus was sunk in the North Atlantic in February 1942.

Construction
Arbutus was placed on order in July 1939, one of the first 26 "Flowers" of the pre-war building programme. She was laid down at the Blyth Shipbuilding Company, at Blyth, Northumberland, on 30 November 1939. She was launched on 5 June 1940 and completed 12 October 1940. She commissioned on the same day under the command of Lt. Cdr. H Lloyd Williams, RNVR, one of the earliest Volunteer Reserve command appointments.

World War II service
In this role she was engaged in all the duties performed by escort ships; protecting convoys, searching for and attacking U-boats, and rescuing survivors. Over the next 14 months Arbutus escorted 26 convoys on the Atlantic routes, helping to bring over 750 ships to safety, though a number were lost in various incidents. She was involved in two convoy battles, and helped destroy two U-boats.

In March 1941, Arbutus, with 6 EG, escorted convoy OB 293 when it came under attack by a force of U-boats. The escort group mounted a vigorous and aggressive defence, resulting in the destruction of two U-boats and damage to a third, for the loss of two ships sunk and three damaged. During the two-night action, on 7 March 1941, Arbutus and  found and attacked ; she was depth-charged and brought to the surface, where she was abandoned and sank.

In April 1941 6EG went to the aid of convoy SC 26 which was under attack. As she surfaced Arbutus was closing in order to ram her; when he saw she was being abandoned Arbutus then commander, Lt. ALW Warren, changed plans and attempted to capture the submarine before it sank. U-76 was boarded by several members of the corvette's crew, and efforts were made to secure and search the boat while Arbutus made fast to the U-boat with hawsers. However, U-76 was sinking too fast, and the capture failed. This was the first such instance of a U-boat boarding and acquisition in World War II, though it was unsuccessful; the exploit was repeated the following month when U-110 was captured by ships of 3 Escort Group.

Fate
The U-boat sent a sighting report and commenced shadowing, but the transmission was DFed and escorts  and Arbutus ran down the bearing to attack. The U-boat commander, K/L H Zimmmerman, responded aggressively, counter-attacking and torpedoing Arbutus as she approached. The corvette broke in half and sank, with the loss of half her crew. 43 men, including her commander, were lost.
U-136 was subsequently depth-charged by Chelsea, damaged and forced to abandon her pursuit, saving ON 63 from further harm.

Successes
During her service Arbutus was credited with sharing in the destruction of two U-boats:

Notes

References
 Clay Blair: Hitler's U-Boat War Vol I (The Hunters 1939–1942) (1996) 
Gardiner R, Chesnau R: Conway's All the World's Fighting Ships 1922–1946 (1980) 
 Elliott, P: Allied Escort Ships of World War II (1977) 
 Arnold Hague: The Allied Convoy System 1939–1945 (2000). ISBN (Canada) 1 55125 033 0 .   ISBN (UK) 1 86176 147 3
 Paul Kemp: U-Boats Destroyed  (1997). 
 Axel Neistle: German U-Boat Losses during World War II (1998).

External links
HMS Arbutus on the Arnold Hague database at convoyweb.org.uk.
Arbutus at uboat.net
Arbutus at navalhistory.net

Flower-class corvettes of the Royal Navy
1940 ships
Maritime incidents in February 1942
Ships sunk by German submarines in World War II
World War II shipwrecks in the Atlantic Ocean
Ships built on the River Blyth